Mercury CX, formerly Media Resource Centre (MRC), is a not-for-profit film and television training organisation based in the Lion Arts Centre on the corner of Morphett Street and North Terrace, Adelaide, South Australia, which aims to give screening opportunities to emerging South Australian film, video and digital media artists. It also manages the not-for-profit Mercury Cinema, which shows films by subscription to the Adelaide Cinémathèque film society, screening classic or notable films and hosts film festivals and other events. Mercury CX hosts the Screenmakers Conference and the South Australian Screen Awards.

History
The Media Resource Centre was established in 1974 and is one of the earliest members of the Screen Development Australia (SDA) national network. It moved from its first location at 1 Union Street to a larger location in Pirie Street in the 1980s, where it provided a venue to screen local filmmakers' works as well as other independent, community or hard-to-find international films; it also provided equipment space for filmmakers to work on their projects and network with others.

In 1992 the MRC moved to the purpose-built Lion Arts Centre, located in a refurbished factory in the West End of Adelaide and housing numerous arts organisations, including galleries and theatres. It merged with Commedia, a community media organisation, at the same time. The Mercury and Iris cinemas were created next door and opened by Queen Elizabeth II in 1992.

In 2019 the MRC director was Gail Kovatseff.

During the COVID-19 pandemic in South Australia, the cinema was forced to close for a while from March 2020. During this time, renovations were undertaken, with the foyer transformed into a lounge bar. The organisation was rebranded Mercury CX and a new website launched.

The organisation has struggled to remain solvent, and has relied heavily on public funding by the state government. In 2022 the South Australian Government refused a request for $700,000 to $1.2 million in annual funding, but months later offered $50,000 to help the organisation find a way to keep afloat. A new board started its term on 1 December, led by former South Australian Film Corporation chair Peter Hanlon and producer Kirsty Stark, and including producers Lisa Scott of Highview Productions and Rebecca Summerton of Closer Productions.

Governance and funding
Mercury CX is a membership-based association, which holds charitable status. It has a constitution and a board of directors to oversee its management.

Since May 2019 and  the chair of the board is Gena Ashwell, while the CEO is Karena Slaninka.

The organisation was in the past funded by Screen Australia.  it receives  annually from the South Australian Film Corporation specifically to support talent development in the Australian film industry. At the AGM on 31 May 2022, members voted unanimously to oppose closing down the organisation. CEO Slaninka said that extra funding was need to help the cinema recover from the effects of the COVID-19 pandemic in South Australia, and that a "Save the Mercury" campaign to raise funds would be launched.

Description
Mercury CX is a not-for-profit incorporated association which provides facilities for career development in the film industry, from entry-level to early career, providing access to equipment, advice and a subsidy programme. It offers production support, professional development and industry and community partnerships. The offices are located in the Lion Arts Centre on the corner of Morphett Street and North Terrace, Adelaide.

Mercury Cinema
The Mercury Cinema building includes its main 186-seat cinema as well as the 36-seat Iris Cinema, situated adjacent to the Lion Arts Centre, facing Morphett Street. As a not-for-profit organisation, there is a film society, Adelaide Cinémathèque, members of which can attend regularly scheduled films. The Iris is available for hire as a venue, and is used for Adelaide Fringe performances as well as for many other uses. The Cinema also runs a series of programmes on a weekly or bi-weekly basis, such as Sunday Sessions and Seniors on Screen, and a school holiday programme.

The Cinema also hosts film festivals, some one-off and some annual occurrences. In the latter group are a programme of the best films from the Flickerfest (a Sydney festival for short films), films from the Adelaide Festival Centre's OzAsia Festival, selected films for the Adelaide Film Festival, and the Iranian Film Festival Australia (which occurs in most of Australia's capital cities).

Screen Makers Conference 
The Screen Makers Conference is an annual national conference hosted by the MRC since 2014, and aims to "[bring] together Australia’s writers, directors, producers and other screen creatives to share knowledge, connect with the industry, and pitch projects to the national marketplace". It is regarded as one of two major annual conferences for filmmakers, the other being the Australian International Documentary Conference.

In 2018 the Conference attracted over 200 delegates, including  Screen Australia CEO Graeme Mason and Kingston Anderson from the Australian Directors' Guild, independent filmmaker and educator Cathy Henkel, Rowan Woods, currently head of directing at the Australian Film, Television and Radio School, senior managers from several major national TV companies as well as the government-owned broadcasters, the ABC and SBS.

In 2019 it expanded to three days, partnered with television production company Screentime and also included video games in its remit.

South Australian Screen Awards 
The Media Resource Centre has run the South Australian Screen Awards (SASAs) since establishing them in 1999, to "exhibit, celebrate and promote the best screen works of the South Australian film industry". These are awarded in conjunction with the Screenmakers' Conference, and in 2019 awarded  of prizes, including two new awards: best costume,  and best hair & makeup.

Project funding
The Mercury CX supports developing South Australian filmmakers via its own programs and in collaboration with other organisations. Its Production Initiative Program (PIP)  which funded five shorts and web series in 2020. Selected projects are often then developed in the Mercury CX's career development program, Springboard+ (formerly Springboard).

Since 2021, Mercury CX has participated in the Film Lab: New Voices initiative launched by the South Australian Film Corporation and Adelaide Film Festival (AFF). This program supports emerging filmmakers, with three teams selected for mentoring over an 11-month development period and one team then selected for funding to complete a low-budget feature film which is premiered at the next AFF.

References

External links 
 

Film schools in Australia
Australian film awards
Culture of Adelaide
1974 establishments in Australia